Events from the year 1854 in Denmark.

Incumbents
 Monarch – Frederick VII
 Prime minister – Anders Sandøe Ørsted (until 12 December), Peter Georg Bang

Events

 2 May Realskolen for Frederiksberg og Vesterbro (later Schneekloths Skole) is founded.
 26 July  The Cabinet of Ørsted adopts a helstatsforfatning.
 12 December  The Cabinet of Bang-Scheel is formed.
 18 December  A large National Liberal demonstration takes place in Copenhagen.

Undated
 Lumskebugten opens at Nordre Toldbod in Copenhagen.
  Sophus Berendsen establishes as wholesaler of iron and glass for the construction industry in Copenhagen (later developing into Berendsen).
 Arent Nicolai Dragsted establishes his own goldsmith's workshop on Bredgade in Copenhagen.
 The company Frichs is founded by Søren Frich in Aarhus.
 Lauritz Rasmussen establishes a zinc and bronze foundry at Åbenrå 24 in Copenhagen.

Births
 5 August – L. A. Ring, painter (died 1933)

Deaths
 30 January –  Jacob Peter Mynster, theologian and bishop (born 1775) 
 23 March – Johannes Søbøtker, merchant, plantation owner and governor (born 1777)
 9 July – Marie Toft, landowner (born 1813)

References

 
1850s in Denmark
Denmark
Years of the 19th century in Denmark